Rühstädt is a municipality in the Prignitz district, in Brandenburg, Germany. It is located close the confluence of the rivers Havel and Elbe. Rühstädt is famous for its high number of resident white storks and has been awarded the title European Stork Village by the initiative EuroNatur in 1996.

Demography

References

Localities in Prignitz